The 2006 Sydney Roosters season was the 99th in the club's history. They competed in the NRL's 2006 Telstra Premiership and finished the regular season 14th (out of 15).

Results

Player Summary

References

Sydney Roosters seasons
Sydney Roosters season